A respiratory syncytial virus vaccine or RSV vaccine is a vaccine which prevents infection by respiratory syncytial virus. , no licensed vaccine against RSV exists. An advisory panel to the U.S. Food and Drug Administration (FDA) has recommended RSV vaccines from Pfizer and GSK.

The desired vaccine would prevent lower respiratory infection from RSV in at-risk populations and if possible, be useful in other populations with less risk. Attempts to develop an RSV vaccine began in the 1960s with an unsuccessful inactivated vaccine developed by exposing the RSV virus to formalin (formalin-inactivated RSV (FI-RSV)). This vaccine induced a phenomenon that came to be known as vaccine-associated enhanced respiratory disease (VAERD), in which children who had not previously been exposed to RSV and were subsequently vaccinated would develop a severe form of RSV disease if exposed to the virus itself, including fever, wheezing, and bronchopneumonia. Some eighty percent of such children (vs. 5% of virus-exposed controls) were hospitalized, and two children died of lethal lung inflammatory response during the first natural RSV infection after vaccination of RSV-naive infants.  This disaster hindered vaccine development for many years to come.

A 1998 paper reported that research toward developing a vaccine had advanced greatly over the previous 10 years. Twenty years later, a 2019 paper similarly claimed that research toward developing a vaccine had advanced greatly over the prior 10 years. The same study predicted that a vaccine would be available within 10 years.

Types of vaccines still in research include particle-based vaccines, attenuated vaccines, mRNA vaccines, protein subunit vaccines, or vector-based vaccines. As of October 2022, Johnson & Johnson and Moderna are also running phase III trials in older adults for candidate RSV vaccines based on stabilized prefusion F proteins.

GSK 
GSK developed a vaccine, GSK3888550A, which entered phase III clinical trials in November 2020. Barney S. Graham and Peter Kwong of the National Institute of Allergy and Infectious Diseases' Vaccine Research Center, along with Jason McLellan, a former postdoctoral researcher at VRC and a professor at The University of Texas at Austin, spearheaded its development. The vaccine's antigen, a stabilized version of the RSV F protein, was developed using structure-based vaccine design.

References

Vaccines
Clinical trials
Viral respiratory tract infections